Bob Hewitt and Frew McMillan defeated Robert Lutz and Stan Smith in the final, 7–5, 7–6, 6–3 to win the doubles tennis title at the 1977 Masters Grand Prix.

Fred McNair and Sherwood Stewart were the reigning champions, but they did not compete this year.

Knockout stage

Finals

References
1977 Masters-Doubles

Doubles